Cattleya forbesii, or Forbes' cattleya, is a species of orchid.  The diploid chromosome number of C. forbesii has been determined as 2n = 54–60.

References

External links

forbesii
forbesii